Ciechanów may mean:
 Ciechanów, a town in Masovian Voivodeship, east-central Poland
 Ciechanów, Lower Silesian Voivodeship in Gmina Jemielno, Góra County in Lower Silesian Voivodeship, south-western Poland
 Ciechanów Voivodeship (1975–1998), an administrative division superseded by the Masovian Voivodeship, Poland
 Ciechanow Commune, a rural administrative district in Ciechanów County, Poland
 Ciechanów County, an administrative district in Masovian Voivodeship, east-central Poland
 Ciechanów District (1939–1945), an administrative region created when Nazi Germany annexed Poland

See also
Ciechanówek
Ciechanover